Westminster-Chilliwack was a provincial electoral district in the Canadian province of British Columbia from 1894 to 1898.  It and its sister ridings Westminster-Delta, Westminster-Dewdney and Westminster-Richmond were successors to the old four-member Westminster riding, which appeared in 1890 only and was a subdivision of the older New Westminster (provincial electoral district) riding.  Westminster-Chilliwack was succeeded by the Chilliwhack riding in the election of 1903.

Electoral history 
Note: winners in each election in bold. 

|- bgcolor="white"
!align="right" colspan=3|Total valid votes
!align="right"|628
!align="right"|100.00%
!align="right"|
|- bgcolor="white"
!align="right" colspan=3|Total rejected ballots
!align="right"|
!align="right"|
!align="right"|
|- bgcolor="white"
!align="right" colspan=3|Turnout
!align="right"|%
!align="right"|
!align="right"|
|}

|- bgcolor="white"
!align="right" colspan=3|Total valid votes
!align="right"|547
!align="right"|100.00%
!align="right"|
|- bgcolor="white"
!align="right" colspan=3|Total rejected ballots
!align="right"|
!align="right"|
!align="right"|
|- bgcolor="white"
!align="right" colspan=3|Turnout
!align="right"|%
!align="right"|
!align="right"|
|}

|- bgcolor="white"
!align="right" colspan=3|Total valid votes
!align="right"|518
!align="right"|100.00%
!align="right"|
|- bgcolor="white"
!align="right" colspan=3|Total rejected ballots
!align="right"|
!align="right"|
!align="right"|
|- bgcolor="white"
!align="right" colspan=3|Turnout
!align="right"|%
!align="right"|
!align="right"|
|}

Former provincial electoral districts of British Columbia